Emmanuel Unaka is a Nigerian former footballer who is last known to have plied his trade with Clementi Khalsa of the Singaporean S.League in 2001.

Singapore

For uttering racial pejoratives at each other during a game, Unaka and Singaporean striker Toh Choon Ming were brought before the S.League Disciplinary Committee in August 2001, each getting a four-match ban and fined 2000 Singaporean dollars.

References 

Association football defenders
Nigerian expatriate footballers
Expatriate footballers in Singapore
Living people
Nigerian footballers
Singapore Premier League players
Balestier Khalsa FC players
Year of birth missing (living people)